Guy Herpin (20 April 1899 – 23 March 1968) was a sailor from France, who represented his country at the 1924 Summer Olympics in Le Havre, France.

References

Sources
 
 

French male sailors (sport)
Sailors at the 1924 Summer Olympics – 6 Metre
Olympic sailors of France
1899 births
1968 deaths